Karishma Ramharack (born 20 January 1995) is a Trinidadian cricketer who plays for Trinidad and Tobago, Guyana Amazon Warriors and the West Indies as a right-arm off break bowler. In January 2019, she was named in the West Indies squad for their series against Pakistan. She made her Women's Twenty20 International cricket (WT20I) debut for the West Indies against Pakistan Women on 3 February 2019. She made her Women's One Day International cricket (WODI) debut for the West Indies, also against Pakistan Women, on 11 February 2019. In July 2019, Cricket West Indies awarded her with a central contract for the first time, ahead of the 2019–20 season.

In October 2021, she was named as one of three reserve players in the West Indies team for the 2021 Women's Cricket World Cup Qualifier tournament in Zimbabwe. In February 2022, she was named in the West Indies team for the 2022 Women's Cricket World Cup in New Zealand.

References

External links
 
 

1995 births
Living people
Trinidad and Tobago women cricketers
West Indian women cricketers
West Indies women One Day International cricketers
West Indies women Twenty20 International cricketers
Guyana Amazon Warriors (WCPL) cricketers
Trinidad and Tobago people of Indian descent